Coomanum singulare is a species of beetle in the family Cerambycidae, and the only species in the genus Coomanum. It was described by Pic in 1927.

References

Apomecynini
Beetles described in 1927
Monotypic Cerambycidae genera